The Japan Golf Tour is a prominent golf tour. It was founded in 1973 and as of 2006 it offers the third-highest annual prize fund out of the regular (that is not for seniors) men's professional tours after the PGA Tour and the European Tour. However, since the early 1990s, the growth in prize money has not kept pace with that on the two larger tours. Official events on the Japan Golf Tour count for World Golf Ranking points, and success on the tour can also qualify members to play in the majors.

Most of the leading players on the tour are Japanese, but players from many other countries also participate. The tour is currently run by the Japan Golf Tour Organization (JGTO), which was established in 1999 to separate the tour from the PGA of Japan. The JGTO also organises a developmental tour called the Japan Challenge Tour.

Masashi "Jumbo" Ozaki has been the dominant player on tour, leading the career wins list with 94, the career money list with over ¥2 billion, and winning the money title twelve times between 1973 and 1998.

Entry to The Open Championship is given to Order of Merit winner and runner-up, Japan Open Golf Championship winner, two players not already exempt from the money list up to the Japan Golf Tour Championship, and the top four non-exempt players from the Mizuno Open.

In December 2022, a new agreement involving the JGTO, PGA Tour and European Tour was announced. As part of the deal, from 2023 onwards the top three on the Japan Golf Tour's season-ending money list will earn status to play on the European Tour for the following season.

Money list winners

Multiple money list titles
The following players have won more than one money list title through 2021:

Career money leaders
The table shows the top ten career money leaders on the Japan Golf Tour through the 2021 season. The figures shown include money won in the four global major championships from 1998 onwards and in the individual World Golf Championships from 1999 to 2009.

There is a full list on the Japan Golf Tour's website here.

Records
Youngest winner: Ryo Ishikawa (amateur) 15 years, 238 days (Munsingwear Open KSB Cup, 2007)

See also
Japan Golf Association
List of golfers with most Japan Golf Tour wins

Notes

References

External links
 

 
Professional golf tours
1973 establishments in Japan
Organizations established in 1973